Avik Chowdhury (born 16 November 1984) is an Indian former cricketer. He played seven first-class matches for Bengal in 2008.

See also
 List of Bengal cricketers

References

External links
 

1984 births
Living people
Indian cricketers
Bengal cricketers
Cricketers from Kolkata